Terinebrica portentifica is a species of moth of the family Tortricidae. It is found in Brazil.

Subspecies
Terinebrica portentifica portentifica (Brazil: São Paulo)
Terinebrica portentifica tecta Razowski & Becker, 2001 (Brazil: Santa Catarina)

References

Moths described in 2001
Euliini